Les Onze Mille Verges ou les Amours d'un hospodar  is a pornographic novel by French author Guillaume Apollinaire, published in 1907 over his initials "G.A.”. The title contains a play on the Catholic veneration of the "Eleven thousand Virgins" (French: les onze mille vierges), the martyred companions of Saint Ursula, replacing the word vierge (virgin) with verge (rod) due to a slip of the tongue by the protagonist and as an omen of his fate. The use of the word verge may also be considered as a pun, for it is used as a vulgarism for the male member.

It was translated into English by Alexander Trocchi (using the pseudonym "Oscar Mole") as The Debauched Hospodar (1953); by Nina Rootes as Les onze mille verges: or, The Amorous Adventures of Prince Mony Vibescu (1976); and later by Alexis Lykiard as The Eleven Thousand Rods (2008).

Literary background
Les Onze Mille Verges draws on the work of earlier erotic writers, including the Marquis De Sade, Rétif de la Bretonne,
André Robert de Nerciat and Pietro Aretino.

Theme
Les Onze Mille Verges tells the fictional story of the Romanian hospodar Prince Mony Vibescu, in which Apollinaire explores all aspects of sexuality: sadism alternates with masochism; ondinism / scatophilia with vampirism; pedophilia with gerontophilia; masturbation with group sex; lesbianism with male homosexuality. The writing is alert, fresh and concrete, humour is always present, and the entire novel exudes an "infernal joy", which finds its apotheosis in the final scene.

Reception
Admirers of Les Onze Mille Verges
included Louis Aragon, Robert Desnos and Pablo Picasso, who dubbed the novel 
Apollinaire's masterpiece.

Case before the ECHR
In a case lodged before the European Court of Human Rights by a Turkish publisher of the novel, for his conviction under the Turkish Criminal Code "for publishing obscene or immoral material liable to arouse and exploit sexual desire among the population”, followed by the seizure and destruction of all the copies of the book and a fine for the publisher, the Court found that the Turkish authorities had violated Article 10 of the European Convention on Human Rights protecting the freedom of expression. The Court stated that the work belonged to the “European literary heritage”.

In a different case judge Bonello, in his concurring opinion, after citing the description of the book from Wikipedia, described the work as a "smear of transcendental smut”.

References and notes

 Neil Cornwell, The absurd in literature, Manchester University Press, 2006, pp. 86–87
 Patrick J. Kearney, A History of Erotic Literature, 1982, pp. 163–4
 Karín Lesnik-Oberstein, The last taboo: women and body hair, Manchester University Press, 2006, p. 94
 Roger Shattuck, The banquet years: the arts in France, 1885-1918: Alfred Jarry, Henri Rousseau, Erik Satie, Guillaume Apollinaire, Doubleday, 1961, p. 268
 Lisa Z. Sigel, International exposure: perspectives on modern European pornography, 1800-2000, Rutgers University Press, 2005, p. 132
 Chris Gates and Rob Murphy, Privates, 2010, a short film featuring selected readings https://www.youtube.com/watch?v=yGruZgm3vRo

1907 French novels
Works by Guillaume Apollinaire
French erotic novels
Pornographic novels
Censored books
Works published under a pseudonym